Sadruddin Islahi (1917 - 1998) was an Indian Islamic Urdu writer and a close companion of Abul A'la Maududi. He was one of the early members of Jamat e Islami.

Early life and education
Islahi was born in 1917 in Sidha Sultanpur, Azamgarh district, Uttar Pradesh, British India. After early school education, he went to an Islamic school, Madrasatul Islah, to get a degree in religious education in 1937.

Membership of Jamat e Islami
Islahi joined Jamat-e-Islami in its early days and remained an active member until his death. He corresponded with Abul A'la Maududi who was mentoring him as a writer.

Writing career
After completing his education, Islahi started writing articles for different journals. He was also published in the Islamic journal, Tarjuman ul Quran, Hyderabad. When Jamaat-e-Islami Hind asked Abul A'la Maududi to grant his permission for a condensed publication of Tafhim-ul-Quran, he gave his consent only if it was to be done by Sadruddin Islahi.

Books
 Haqiqat-e-Nifaq (1944)
 Ifadat-e-hazrat shah waliullah dehlvi (Translation) (1944)
 Haqeeqat-e-Ubudiyat (1946)
 Islam Ek Nazar Mein (Islam at a Glance) (1961)
 Asase Deen ki Tameer (Building up the foundations of faith) (1969)
 Maaraka-e-islam-o-jahiliyat (1991)
 Islam Aur Ijtimaiyat (Islam And Collectivism)
 Quran Majeed Ka Ta'aruf
 Fareeza Iqamat-e-Deen 
 Tahreek-e-Islami Hind (Jamat-e-Islami Hind Conceptual Basis)

Death
Islahi died on November 13,1998, in Azamgarh district, Uttar Pradesh.

References

1917 births
1998 deaths
People from Azamgarh district
Indian Muslim scholars of Islam